Porter Township, Ohio may refer to:

Porter Township, Delaware County, Ohio
Porter Township, Scioto County, Ohio

Ohio township disambiguation pages